Onychoteuthis is a genus of squid in the family Onychoteuthidae. The type species is Onychoteuthis bergii. While the genus is found worldwide in tropical and subtropical oceans, they can also occur in the North Pacific Ocean. There were previously considered to be four species in the genus but there are now considered to be roughly 10. These squid are frequently observed in the surface waters at night and they are often caught using dipnet at nightlight stations. The young squid are usually the only specimens captured using standard midwater trawls, the older squid are apparently able to avoid the trawls. They can, however be collected from the air as individuals are able to leap high out of the water, sometimes even landing on the deck of a ship.

Anatomy

Most species belonging to the genus have a mantle length of under 200 mm, however the larger members may measure over 300 mm. The species in this genus have a densely muscular, cylindrical mantle which is tapered posteriorly into a pointed tail. Their skin is smooth and has no warts or wrinkles. The gladius can be seen through the skin along the midline of the back. The fins are rhomboid in shape, heart shape or arrow shaped and are pointed posteriorly. The species of Onychoteuthis have 8-10 prominent nuchal folds. Their tentacular clubs have 2 central series of 19-27 large, strong hooks on their manus and the adults either have no lateral sucker series no marginal series of suckers. or they are vestigial. The chitinous rings of the suckers on the arms is smooth, with no teeth. They have photophores in their mantle cavity with a small one placed anteriorly on the ink sac, another near the anus; a large one placed posteriorly on the intestine and a bilobed photophore located on the ventral surface of
each eye.

Species
The following species are included in the genus:

Onychoteuthis aequimanus Gabb, 1868
Onychoteuthis banksii (Leach, 1817), common clubhook squid
Onychoteuthis bergii Lichtenstein, 1818
Onychoteuthis borealijaponica Okada, 1927, boreal clubhook squid
Onychoteuthis compacta (Berry, 1913)
Onychoteuthis horstkottei Bolstad, 2010
Onychoteuthis lacrima Bolstad & Seki, 2008
Onychoteuthis meridiopacifica Rancurel & Okutani, 1990
Onychoteuthis mollis (Appellöf, 1891)
Onychoteuthis prolata Bolstad, Vecchione & Young, 2008

There are also two species which are considered taxa inquirendum and up to 11 which are classed as ''nomen dubia.

References

Squid
Cephalopod genera
Bioluminescent molluscs